Blue Jacket Creek is a stream located entirely within Logan County, Ohio.

Blue Jacket Creek was named after Blue Jacket, an Indian chief.

See also
List of rivers of Ohio

References

Rivers of Logan County, Ohio
Rivers of Ohio